Sebastiania macrocarpa is a species of flowering plant in the family Euphorbiaceae. It was described in 1866. It is native to Ceará, Brazil.

References

Plants described in 1866
Flora of Brazil
macrocarpa
Taxa named by Johannes Müller Argoviensis